Mousson is a commune in the Meurthe-et-Moselle department in north-eastern France. The village lies on a hilltop, adjacent to the east of Pont-à-Mousson.

See also
 Communes of the Meurthe-et-Moselle department

References

Communes of Meurthe-et-Moselle